Danutė Budreikaitė (born May 16, 1953 in Vilnius) is a Lithuanian politician who was a Member of the European Parliament from 2014 to 2019 as part of the Alliance of Liberals and Democrats for Europe.  Budreikaitė chose not to run for re-election in the 2019 European parliament elections.

References

1953 births
Living people
Academic staff of Vilnius University
21st-century Lithuanian women politicians
21st-century Lithuanian politicians
Labour Party (Lithuania) MEPs
MEPs for Lithuania 2004–2009
Women MEPs for Lithuania
Vilnius University alumni